is a Japanese television series produced by Tsuburaya Productions. The 27th entry to the Ultra Series, it is currently the last series to air as part of the New Ultraman Retsuden programming block on TV Tokyo. On July 13 Crunchyroll announced it would be simulcast in North America on their site and app, making it the first tokusatsu show in the world to be simulcast while airing in Japan.

Story 

A solar flare called the  has awakened mysterious OOPArts known as Spark Dolls from the depths of the earth and the ocean, materializing them into rampaging monsters that terrorize the Earth. Due to this, UNVER was formed to gather, collect and secure unstable Spark Dolls and a new attack team was formed, Xio to combat monster threats.

Fifteen years later, Daichi Ozora, a member of Xio's Lab Team who was orphaned when his parents got lost in the Ultra Flare, bonds and transforms into Ultraman X to battle threats from both aliens and monsters. He soon learns of the truth behind Ultra Flare and resolves to help Ultraman X to regain his physical body after the incident had trapped him in the form of computer data.

In the middle of the series, Daichi learns how to properly summon a Cyber Monster and thus, bringing forth Cyber Gomora, a monster modelled after his childhood Spark Doll, Gomora, becoming one of Xio's new allies and an alternative for Daichi whenever X is unable to fight. At the same time a strange energy source dubbed by Xio as  frequently appears and turns ordinary monsters into berserks. Because the energy's effect also weakens X, it nearly killed him during his fight with Tsurugi Demaaga, the first victim of Dark Thunder Energy. To counter this, a new weapon was discovered by Daichi, the X-Lugger, which allows X to become Ultraman Exceed X and use the weapon to purify monsters from Dark Thunder Energy. In accordance to an alien named Dada, humanity is on the verge of extinction from the effect of Dark Thunder Energy's assault.

At the end of the series, the mastermind behind the Ultra Flare and Dark Thunder Energy appeared, namely Greeza. Having destroyed three planets in the past, it was thought to be killed after X banished it to the sun but instead survived and had journeyed through Mercury and Venus within 18 days. Now having arrived on Earth, Greeza sought to absorb the Spark Dolls to achieve its strongest evolution and X revealed himself to Xio members, seeking cooperation to defend their supply of Spark Dolls from Greeza. In the end, X and Daichi seemingly died after performing a kamikaze attack but Greeza survived its destruction and successfully absorbs Xio's Spark Dolls, finally achieving its final evolution. It wasn't until Asuna managed to bring Daichi back to the real world and X revived, with both managing to pursue the captured Spark Dolls to escape and merged with the Ultra to finish Greeza. Although the destroyer is killed, X however has yet to regain his true body, while continuing his service in Xio.

Episodes

Other media

Films and team-up
 Ultraman X The Movie had premiered on March 12, 2016, in celebration of the 50th anniversary of Ultraman and the Ultra Series. The project was announced by Tsuburaya Productions on July 23, 2015 and in Ultraman Festival 2015. On November 28, 2015, the title and the film poster were announced in Tsuburaya Productions' blog.
 Ultraman Orb The Movie (2017), X with his human host Daichi Ozora teams up with Ultraseven, Zero, Ginga, Victory and Orb in this movie. This film is a prequel to the Ultraman Orb Chronicle Chapter 8 "Super Sky Great Evil Beast Desastro" story arc.
Ultra Galaxy Fight (2019, 2022):
Ultraman Taiga The Movie (2020): See here

Cast
: 
: 
: 
: 
: 
: 
• Takeru Yamagishi(|山岸 タケル|Yamagishi Takeru) TAKERU
: 
: 
: 
: 
, Narration: 
Navigation Voice, Announcement:

Guest cast

: 
: 
: 
: 
/: 
: 
: 
: 
/: 
/: 
: 
: 
: 
: 
:

Songs
Opening theme

Lyrics: 
Composition & Arrangement: 
Artist: Voyager feat. Daichi Ozora (Kensuke Takahashi)
Ending theme

Lyrics: TAKERU, Chiaki Seshimo
Composition & Arrangement: Takao Konishi
Artist: Voyager
Insert theme

Lyrics: , 
Composition & Arrangement: Takao Konishi
Artist: Voyager
Episodes: 5

Lyrics: 
Composition & Arrangement: Takao Konishi
Artist: Voyager
Episodes: 13

Lyrics: Hideki Tama, Sei Okazaki
Composition & Arrangement: Takao Konishi
Episodes: 13, 14, Recap 2

Lyrics: 
Composition & Arrangement: 
Artist: TEAM DASH with Project DMM
Episodes: Recap 2
"NO LIMITED"
Lyrics, Composition, & Arrangement: 
Artist: Project DMM
Episodes: Recap 2

Lyrics & Composition: 
Arrangement: Toshihiko Takamizawa with 
Artist: The Alfee
Episodes: Recap 2

See also
 Ultra Series - Complete list of official Ultraman-related shows.

Notes

References

External links
Ultraman X at Tsuburaya Productions 

2015 Japanese television series debuts
2016 Japanese television series endings
Ultra television series
TV Tokyo original programming